Carlos Gdansky Orgambide, better known by his stage name Carlos Orgambide (born 28 September 1930 in Buenos Aires) is an Argentine film director and screenwriter. He is the younger brother of author Pedro Orgambide.

Selected filmography
 El Hombre y su noche (1958)
 Intriga en Lima (1965)
 Queridas amigas (1980)
 The Supporter (1991)

Awards
 1992 Silver Condor Award for Best Adapted Screenplay for The Supporter (shared with Bernardo Roitman)

External links 
 
 Información sobre Carlos Orgambide en el sitio del cine nacional  

1930 births
Living people
Argentine film directors
Argentine screenwriters
Silver Condor Award for Best Adapted Screenplay winners